Krishan Lal Panwar is a politician from Haryana who served as Minister of transport and member of the Haryana Legislative Assembly from the BJP representing the Israna Vidhan sabha Constituency in Haryana.

References 

Members of the Haryana Legislative Assembly
1958 births
Living people
Bharatiya Janata Party politicians from Haryana
Rajya Sabha members from Haryana